Tiberiu Olah or Tibor Oláh (2 January 1928 – 2 October 2002) was a Romanian-Hungarian composer, teacher and musicologist.

Biography
Tiberiu Olah was born in Arpad, Bihor, and began his studies at the Cluj Conservatory in 1946. From 1949-54 he studied at the Moscow Conservatory, and in 1958 he took a position as a lecturer and later as a professor at the Bucharest Conservatory. Notable students include Doina Rotaru, Costin Miereanu, Horațiu Rădulescu and Christian Wilhelm Berger.

Olah was a member of the Csodamalom Bábszínház Puppet Theater where he acted as a puppeteer. He received grants for research in musicology and presented studies and papers internationally. He also published reviews and articles in journals including Studii de Muzicologie, Muzica, România Literară and Melos. He died in Târgu Mureș.

Works
Olah was known for popularizing the oratorio. Selected compositions include: 
Cantata for women's choir, two flutes, string and percussion instruments 1956, Csango popular texts, translated by Nina Cassian 
Prind visele aripi 1959, cantata for mixed choir and orchestra 
Lumina lui Lenin 1959, cantata for male choir and string orchestra on lyrics by Nina Cassian 
O stâncă se înalță 1959, cantata for mixed choir and orchestra lyrics by Maria Banus 
The Galaxy of Man 1960, oratorio for reciter, high voice, mixed choir and orchestra by Vladimir Mayakovsky lyrics
Symphony 1956 
Michael the Brave 1971, symphonic suite from the film music 
Homonymous Crescendo 1972, piece for orchestra 
Condemnation 1976, music video

His music has been recorded and issued on media including:
[Electrecord ST-ECE 02941] Invocations III, Harmonies IV, Sonata for Clarinet solo, Sonata for Flute solo, Space and Rhythm (LP, 1986)
 [Electrecord ST-CS 0201] Daniel Kientzy - Stockhausen / Cavanna / Harrison / Olah / Ioachimescu- Saxophone Contemporain  (LP, 1986)

Awards
Romanian Academy Award, 1965
Film Music Award for White Pelican, 1966
International Prize for Koussewitzky, USA, 1967
Grand Prize of the Union of Composers and Musicologists of Romania for All Creation, 1993

References

External links

https://web.archive.org/web/20101119150720/http://www.tiberiuolah.ro/home.html

1928 births
2002 deaths
20th-century classical composers
People from Bihor County
Romanian musicologists
Romanian classical composers
Romanian musicians of Hungarian descent
Moscow Conservatory alumni
Academic staff of the National University of Music Bucharest
Male classical composers
20th-century musicologists
20th-century male musicians